"Marianne" was the  entry in the Eurovision Song Contest 1968, performed in Italian by Sergio Endrigo.

The song is a ballad, with Endrigo expressing his love for the title character. He sings, however, that she never stays with him, and he wonders about what she is doing. Nonetheless, his feelings for her remain unaltered.

The song was performed eleventh on the night, following 's Isabelle Aubret with "La source" and preceding the 's Cliff Richard with "Congratulations". At the close of voting, it had received 7 points, placing it 10th in a field of 17.

It was succeeded as Italian representative at the 1969 contest by Iva Zanicchi with "Due grosse lacrime bianche".

Cliff Richard version

Following the Contest, it was rewritten in English by Bill Owen for Cliff Richard to record. "Marianne" features an accompaniment by the Mike Leander Orchestra and was released as a single in September with the B-side "Mr. Nice", written by Terry Britten. It peaked at number 22 on the UK Singles Chart.

Reception
Reviewing for Record Mirror, Peter Jones described "Marianne" as "a really lovely ballad, a hymn of praise to a chick, and Cliff really shows off his vocal range, to a swelling, swirling orchestral backing laid down lovingly by Mike Leander. As ever, it's a distinctive vocal treatment and perhaps Cliff's most ambitious bit of actually singing on record". For New Musical Express, Derek Johnson described the song as "a piquant and emotional ballad" that "certainly doesn't register with an immediate impact. But once you've heard it a few times, you'll find that the haunting melody is firmly implanted in your mind, and you just can't lose it".

Track listing
7": Columbia / DB 8476
 "Marianne" – 3:19
 "Mr. Nice" – 2:13

7": Columbia / DSA 834 (South Africa)
 "Marianne" – 3:19
 "Close to Kathy" – 2:48

Charts

References

1968 singles
Eurovision songs of Italy
Eurovision songs of 1968
Cliff Richard songs
1968 songs
Songs written by Sergio Endrigo
Sergio Endrigo songs
Columbia Graphophone Company singles
Song recordings produced by Norrie Paramor